Checkmate is the fifth studio album by American rapper B.G. released on Cash Money Records. It was his last release with the label. All production was done by producer Mannie Fresh. It features guest appearances from the Hot Boys and the Big Tymers. The album debuted at No. 21 on the Billboard 200 with over 130,000 copies sold in its first week of release and was certified Gold by the RIAA a month later with over 500,000 copies sold.

Track listing 
All songs produced by Mannie Fresh.

Certifications

References 

2000 albums
B.G. (rapper) albums
Albums produced by Mannie Fresh
Cash Money Records albums